In mathematics, specifically in order theory and functional analysis, an element  of an ordered topological vector space  is called a quasi-interior point of the positive cone  of  if  and if the order interval  is a total subset of ; that is, if the linear span of   is a dense subset of

Properties 

Examples 

See also

References

Bibliography

  
  

Functional analysis